Ann or Anne Hart  may refer to:

Ann Weaver Hart (born 1948), university president of Temple University
Ann Hart Coulter (born 1961), American lawyer, conservative social and political commentator, author, and syndicated columnist
Anne Hart (Canadian author) (born 1935), Canadian author

See also
Annie Hart (disambiguation)